Ian Melville Logan Hunter (1927-2004) was a British experimental psychologist.

Education and career
Hunter was born in Dunfermline in 1927.  He attended the University of Edinburgh from which he graduated in 1949 with a first class honours degree in psychology. He proceeded to the University of Oxford where he undertook research supervised by George Humphrey. He obtained his DPhil in 1953 for a thesis entitled A comparative investigation of generalization processes. He returned to the University of Edinburgh as a lecturer and remained there until 1962 when he was appointed the Foundation Professor of Psychology at Keele University. He retired in 1982 and moved back to Edinburgh where he died in 2004.

Academic work
Hunter was an experimental psychologist. His early work at Oxford was on transposition behaviour which led to a number of publications (Hunter, 1952). At Oxford, he also became interested, through his supervisor George Humphrey, in Victor of Aveyron - the feral child who was found in Aveyron southern France in 1800 (Hunter, 1993; Itard, 1932)).

While at Edinburgh he became acquainted with Alexander Aitken, a mathematician who had an amazing memory. Hunter undertook some research on Aitken's memory (Hunter, 1962, 1977). Later, he wrote two popular books on memory which sold several hundred thousand copies (Hunter, 1957, 1964).

Publications
 Hunter, I.M.L. (1952). An experimental investigation of the absolute and relative theories of transposition behaviour in children. British Journal of Psychology, 43, 113-128
 Hunter, I.M.L. (1957). Memory: Facts and Fallacies. London: Penguin.
 Hunter, I.M.L. (1962). An exceptional talent for calculative thinking. British Journal of Psychology, 53\\, 243–258.
 Hunter, I.M.L. (1964). Memory. London: Penguin.
 Hunter, I.M.L. (1977). An exceptional memory. British Journal of Psychology, 68, 155–164.
 Hunter, I.M.L. (1993). Heritage from the wild boy of Aveyron. Early Child Development and Care, 95, 143–155.
 Itard, J.M.G. (1932). The Wild Boy of Aveyron''. Translated by George Humphrey and Muriel Humphrey. New York: Century.

References

1927 births
2004 deaths
British psychologists
Scottish psychologists
Experimental psychologists
Alumni of the University of Edinburgh
Alumni of the University of Oxford
Academics of Keele University
20th-century British psychologists
People from Dunfermline